Susan Boos (born 1963, Zurich, Switzerland) is a Swiss journalist and publicist. Since 2005, she is the editor-in-chief of WOZ Die Wochenzeitung. Since 2021 she has been the president of the Swiss Press Council.

Life 
Boos grew up in St. Gallen and completed a training as a teacher at the seminar Rorschach in the canton of St. Gallen. From 1984 to 1991, she worked for the Eastern Swiss Workers' Newspaper (AZ) in St. Gallen, in 1989 as an editor. At the same time, she studied ethnology, political science and journalism at the University of Zurich. In 1991, she moved to the Zurich WOZ Die Wochenzeitung, where she was editor-in-chief from 2005 to 2017. Boos is a jury member of the "Zürcher Journalistenpreis" (Zurich Journalists Prize). 
She publishes intensively on nuclear and energy policy. In 2021 she succeeded Dominique von Burg as the president of the Swiss Press Council.

Awards 
 2005: "Alstom Journalistenpreis" (Alstom Journalist Award) of the energy and transport company Alstom (for several articles in the weekly WOZ)
 2012: Honorary Award of the Nuclear-Free Future Award in the category "Special Recognition" of the Franz Moll Foundation

Writings (selection) 
 "Beherrschtes Entsetzen. Das Leben in der Ukraine zehn Jahre nach Tschernobyl" (Controlled horror. Life in Ukraine ten years after Chernobyl) WOZ, Rotpunktverlag, Zurich 1996, .
 "Strahlende Schweiz. Handbuch zur Atomwirtschaft" (Radiant Switzerland. Handbook for the nuclear industry) WOZ, Rotpunktverlag, Zurich 1999, .
 "Sanktgaller Spitzen : sechs Reportagen aus dem Osten" (Sankt Gallen peaks. [Six reports from the East.) Appenzeller publishing house, Herisau 2003, .
 "Fukushima lässt grüßen. Die Folgen eines Super-GAUs." (Fukushima sends greetings. The consequences of a super-GAUs.) Rotpunktverlag, Zurich 2012, .

References

External links 
 
 

Swiss newspaper journalists
20th-century Swiss journalists
21st-century Swiss journalists
Opinion journalists
Swiss women journalists
1963 births
20th-century Swiss women writers
21st-century Swiss women writers
Living people
Women newspaper editors
Swiss newspaper editors
People from Zürich
People from St. Gallen (city)
University of Zurich alumni